Francisco Ortiz Martín (born 1899, date of death unknown) was a Spanish diver. A member of Bahía de Alicante swimming club, he competed in the men's plain high diving event at the 1924 Summer Olympics, where he finished in 28th position.

References

External links
 
 Campeones/as de España absolutos/as de verano – Saltos. Royal Spanish Swimming Federation, via archive.org.

1899 births
Year of death missing
Spanish male divers
Olympic divers of Spain
Divers at the 1924 Summer Olympics
Sportspeople from Alicante